BICEP (Background Imaging of Cosmic Extragalactic Polarization) and the Keck Array are a series of cosmic microwave background (CMB) experiments. They aim to measure the polarization of the CMB; in particular, measuring the B-mode of the CMB. The experiments have had five generations of instrumentation, consisting of BICEP1 (or just BICEP), BICEP2, the Keck Array, BICEP3, and the BICEP Array. The Keck Array started observations in 2012 and BICEP3 has been fully operational since May 2016, with the BICEP Array beginning installation in 2017/18.

Purpose and collaboration

The purpose of the BICEP experiment is to measure the polarization of the cosmic microwave background. Specifically, it aims to measure the B-modes (curl component) of the polarization of the CMB. BICEP operates from Antarctica, at the Amundsen–Scott South Pole Station. All three instruments have mapped the same part of the sky, around the south celestial pole.

The institutions involved in the various instruments are Caltech, Cardiff University, University of Chicago, Center for Astrophysics  Harvard & Smithsonian, Jet Propulsion Laboratory, CEA Grenoble (FR), University of Minnesota and Stanford University (all experiments); UC San Diego (BICEP1 and 2); National Institute of Standards and Technology (NIST), University of British Columbia and University of Toronto (BICEP2, Keck Array and BICEP3); and Case Western Reserve University (Keck Array).

The series of experiments began at the California Institute of Technology in 2002. In collaboration with the Jet Propulsion Laboratory, physicists Andrew Lange, Jamie Bock, Brian Keating, and William Holzapfel began the construction of the BICEP1 telescope which deployed to the Amundsen-Scott South Pole Station in 2005 for a three-season observing run. Immediately after deployment of BICEP1, the team, which now included Caltech postdoctoral fellows John Kovac and Chao-Lin Kuo, among others, began work on BICEP2. The telescope remained the same, but new detectors were inserted into BICEP2 using a completely different technology: a printed circuit board on the focal plane that could filter, process, image, and measure radiation from the cosmic microwave background. BICEP2 was deployed to the South Pole in 2009 to begin its three-season observing run which yielded the detection of B-mode polarization in the cosmic microwave background.

BICEP1
The first BICEP instrument (known during development as the "Robinson gravitational wave background telescope") observed the sky at 100 and 150 GHz (3 mm and 2 mm wavelength) with an angular resolution of 1.0 and 0.7 degrees. It had an array of 98 detectors (50 at 100 GHz and 48 at 150 GHz), which were sensitive to the polarisation of the CMB. A pair of detectors constitutes one polarization-sensitive pixel. The instrument, a prototype for future instruments, was first described in Keating et al. 2003 and started observing in January 2006 and ran until the end of 2008.

BICEP2

The second-generation instrument was BICEP2. Featuring a greatly improved focal-plane transition edge sensor (TES) bolometer array of 512 sensors (256 pixels) operating at 150 GHz, this 26 cm aperture telescope replaced the BICEP1 instrument, and observed from 2010 to 2012.

Reports stated in March 2014 that BICEP2 had detected B-modes from gravitational waves in the early universe (called primordial gravitational waves), a result reported by the four co-principal investigators of BICEP2: John M. Kovac of the Center for Astrophysics  Harvard & Smithsonian; Chao-Lin Kuo of Stanford University; Jamie Bock of the California Institute of Technology; and Clem Pryke of the University of Minnesota.

An announcement was made on 17 March 2014 from the Center for Astrophysics  Harvard & Smithsonian. However, on 19 June 2014, lowered confidence in confirming the cosmic inflation findings was reported; the accepted and reviewed version of the discovery paper contains an appendix discussing the possible production of the signal by cosmic dust. In part because the large value of the tensor to scalar ratio, which contradicts limits from the Planck data, this is considered the most likely explanation for the detected signal by many scientists. For example, on June 5, 2014 at a conference of the American Astronomical Society, astronomer David Spergel argued that the B-mode polarization detected by BICEP2 could instead be the result of light emitted from dust between the stars in our Milky Way galaxy.

A preprint released by the Planck team in September 2014, eventually accepted in 2016, provided the most accurate measurement yet of dust, concluding that the signal from dust is the same strength as that reported from BICEP2. On January 30, 2015, a joint analysis of BICEP2 and Planck data was published and the European Space Agency announced that the signal can be entirely attributed to dust in the Milky Way.

BICEP2 has combined their data with the Keck Array and Planck in a joint analysis.

The BICEP2 affair forms the subject of a book by Brian Keating.

Keck Array

Immediately next to the BICEP telescope at the Martin A. Pomerantz Observatory building at the South Pole was an unused telescope mount previously occupied by the Degree Angular Scale Interferometer. The Keck Array was built to take advantage of this larger telescope mount. This project was funded by $2.3 million from W. M. Keck Foundation, as well as funding from the National Science Foundation, the Gordon and Betty Moore Foundation, the James and Nelly Kilroy Foundation and the Barzan Foundation. The Keck Array project was originally led by Andrew Lange.

The Keck Array consists of five polarimeters, each very similar to the BICEP2 design, but using a pulse tube refrigerator rather than a large liquid helium cryogenic storage dewar.

The first three started observations in the austral summer of 2010–11; another two started observing in 2012. All of the receivers observed at 150 GHz until 2013, when two of them were converted to observe at 100 GHz. Each polarimeter consists of a refracting telescope (to minimise systematics) cooled by a pulse tube cooler to 4 K, and a focal-plane array of 512 transition edge sensors cooled to 250 mK, giving a total of 2560 detectors, or 1280 dual-polarization pixels.

In October 2018, the first results from the Keck Array (combined with BICEP2 data) were announced, using observations up to and including the 2015 season.

In October 2021, new results were announced giving  (at 95% confidence level) based on BICEP/Keck 2018 observation season combined with Planck and WMAP data.

BICEP3
Once the Keck array was completed in 2012, it was no longer cost-effective to continue to operate BICEP2. However, using the same technique as the Keck array to eliminate the large liquid helium dewar, a much larger telescope has been installed on the original BICEP telescope mount.

BICEP3 consists of a single telescope with the same 2560 detectors (observing at 95 GHz) as the five-telescope Keck array, but a 68 cm aperture, providing roughly twice the optical throughput of the entire Keck array. One consequence of the large focal plane is a larger 28° field of view, which will necessarily mean scanning some foreground-contaminated portions of the sky. It was installed (with initial configuration) at the pole in January 2015. It was upgraded for the 2015-2016 Austral summer season to a full 2560 detector configuration. BICEP3 is also a prototype for the BICEP Array.

BICEP Array

The Keck array is being succeeded by the BICEP array, which consists of four BICEP3-like telescopes on a common mount, operating at 30/40, 95, 150 and 220/270 GHz.  Installation began between the 2017 and 2018 observing seasons. It is scheduled to be fully installed by the 2020 observing season.

According to the project website: "BICEP Array will measure the polarized sky in five frequency bands to reach an ultimate sensitivity to the amplitude of IGW [inflationary gravitational waves] of σ(r) < 0.005" and "This measurement will be a definitive test of slow-roll models of inflation, which generally predict a gravitational-wave signal above approximately 0.01."

See also

Cosmology
Inflation (cosmology)
Atacama Cosmology Telescope
South Pole Telescope
Cosmology Large Angular Scale Surveyor
POLARBEAR
LiteBIRD, space-based CMB B-mode polarization search project
Spider, balloon-based CMB B-mode polarization project

References

External links

BICEP2 winter-over (2009–2012) Steffen Richter (9 winters at the South Pole).
Keck winter-over (2010-current) Robert Schwarz (12 winters at the South Pole).

Radio telescopes
Physics experiments
Cosmic microwave background experiments
 Astronomical experiments in the Antarctic
Inflation (cosmology)